Houseley Stevenson (30 July 1879 – 6 August 1953) was a British-American character actor who was born in London on July 30, 1879, and died in Duarte, California on August 6, 1953. 

He began his movie career in 1936 and had a short career in early television productions. Stevenson performed in live stage productions in New York under the name Houseley Stevens. He was a resident teacher at the Pasadena Playhouse in California.  He was the father of actors Houseley Stevenson Jr., Edward Stevenson and Onslow Stevens.

Films

 The Law in Her Hands (1936) – Appellate Court Chief Judge (uncredited)
 The White Angel (1936) – Surgeon (uncredited)
 Bengal Tiger (1936) – Justice of the Peace (uncredited)
 China Clipper (1936) – Doctor (uncredited)
 Isle of Fury (1936) – The Rector 
 Once a Doctor (1937) - Magistrate Kendrick
 Stolen Holiday (1937) - Wedding Official (uncredited)
 Midnight Court (1937) - Mr. Jones - Witness (uncredited)
 The Adventurous Blonde (1937) - Judge Darrell (uncredited)
 The Body Disappears (1941) – Passerby Professor (uncredited)
 Native Land (1942, Documentary) – white sharecropper
 The Man Who Returned to Life (1942) - Colonel Beebe (uncreidted) 
 Crime Doctor (1943) – Martin, Parole Board (uncredited)
 Happy Land (1943) – Sam Watson (uncredited)
 Dakota (1945) – Railroad Clerk (uncredited)
 Without Reservations (1946) - Turnkey (uncredited)
 Somewhere in the Night (1946) - Michael Conroy
 Rendezvous with Annie (1946) - Dr. Grimes (uncredited)
 Little Miss Big (1946) - Duncan 
 The Yearling (1946) - Mr. Ranger (uncredited)
 Easy Come, Easy Go (1947) – Doctor 
 The Brasher Doubloon (1947) - Elisha Morningstar (uncredited)
 Ramrod (1947) - George Smedley
 Time Out of Mind (1947) - George  
 The Ghost and Mrs. Muir (1947) - Gardener (uncredited)
 Cheyenne (1947) - Stableman (uncredited)
 Thunder in the Valley (1947) - Angus MacIvor (uncredited)
 Dark Passage (1947) – Dr. Walter Coley
 Forever Amber (1947) - Mr. Starling (uncredited) 
 Secret Beyond the Door (1947) - Andy (uncredited)
 The Challenge (1948) - Captain Sonnenberg
 Smart Woman (1948) - Joe Smith (uncredited)
 Casbah (1948) – Anton Duval
 The Vicious Circle (1948) – Professor Barr (uncredited)
 Four Faces West (1948) – Anderson
 Moonrise (1948) – Uncle Joe Jingle
 Apartment for Peggy (1948) – Prof. T.J. Beck (uncredited)
 You Gotta Stay Happy (1948) – Jud Tavis
 Joan of Arc (1948) – The Cardinal of Winchester
 Kidnapped (1948) – Ebenezer
 The Paleface (1948) - Pioneer (uncredited)
 Knock on Any Door (1949) - Junior (uncredited)
 The Walking Hills (1949) - King
 Bride of Vengeance (1949) – Councillor
 The Lady Gambles (1949) – Pawnbroker
 Take One False Step (1949) – Dr. Montgomery, Thatcher
 Colorado Territory (1949) – Prospector
 Sorrowful Jones (1949) – Doc Chesley
 Leave It to Henry (1949) – Mr. McCluskey
 Calamity Jane and Sam Bass (1949) – Dakota
 Masked Raiders (1949) - Uncle Henry Trevett
 The Gal Who Took the West (1949) - Ted
 Song of Surrender (1949) – Mr. Abernathy (uncredited)
 All the King's Men (1949) – Madison – the Editor (uncredited)
 Sierra (1950) – Sam Coulter 
 The Gunfighter (1950) - Mr. Barlow (uncredited)
 Edge of Doom (1950) - Mr. Swanson
 The Sun Sets at Dawn (1950) – Pops 
 The Du Pont Story (1950) - Henry du Pont's Assistant (uncredited)
 Hollywood Story (1951) - John Miller
 As Young as You Feel (1951) - Old Man on Park Bench (uncredited)
 The Secret of Convict Lake (1951) – Samuel 'Pawnee Sam' Barlow (uncredited)
 Darling, How Could You! (1951) – Old Man (uncredited)
 All That I Have (1951) – Dr. Charles Grayson
 Cave of Outlaws (1951) – Cooley
 The Wild North (1952) – Old Man
 Oklahoma Annie (1952) – Blinky

Television
Kraft Television Theatre
Episode: Barchester Towers (1948)  
Episode:Spring Green (1948)  
Front Page Detective (1951–1952)
Episode: Galahad (date unknown)
Family Theater
Episode: That I May See (1951)
Gruen Playhouse
Episode:  Joe Santa Claus (1951) – Uncle Willy
Rebound (1952–1953)
Episode: The Old Man (date unknown) – Charles
Adventures of Superman
Episode: Rescue (1952) – Pop Polgase

Stage work
Partial listing

References

External links

 
  (as Houseley Stevens)
 

1879 births
1963 deaths
20th-century American male actors
American male film actors
American male television actors
British emigrants to the United States
Male actors from London
Federal Theatre Project people